The Universidad Autónoma de Occidente (UAO) is a private university, established in 1970. Its first seat was in Champagnat neighborhood, in Cali. In 1999 construction of its new campus was completed, located in the south of the city, in an area called Valle del Lilí. It has a second campus in San Fernando neighborhood, which specializes in complementary education.

UAO has five faculties and 21 undergraduate programs (two of them by dual education system), 12 postgraduate and 7 master's degree. Through Centros Regionales de Educación Superior (CERES), it  also offers bachelor's programs in the towns of El Cerrito, Candelaria and Tuluá.

The university's highlights in the region are the high investment in technology and investigation, reflected by its 64 laboratories, faculty staff with doctorate and master's degrees, and 29 research groups, 26 of which are accepted by Colciencias.

Notable alumni 
 Lucia Aldana, Miss Colombia 2012

References 

Universities and colleges in Colombia
Educational institutions established in 1970
Buildings and structures in Cali
1970 establishments in Colombia